Tepidanaerobacter acetatoxydans  is an anaerobic bacterium from the genus of Tepidanaerobacter.

References

 

Thermoanaerobacterales
Anaerobes
Bacteria described in 2011